John Marshall (April 11, 1858 – March 25, 1931) was a justice of the Kansas Supreme Court from January 11, 1915 to March 25, 1931.

Life and education 
Marshall was born April 11, 1858 in Logansport, Indiana, the son of Humphrey Marshall and Margaret Marshall (nee Rice).
The family then moved to Kansas in 1870, the state John would spend the rest of his life in.
He started his education in the Independence school district, while living in Grenola the place where his mother died while he was young and her grave is located.
His father then moved back to Indiana but John stayed and lived with neighbors. 
He acquired much of his education being self-taught, before going on to spend two years at Kansas State University where he graduated with high honors even though he suffered a severe measles attack during his education. 
He qualified as a teacher holding a first grade teacher's certificate.

After University he returned to Elk county and married Addie Jenks of Mound Branch in 1882.

He served as a member of the school board of Howard, Kansas for several years. 
He was profoundly religious and it was said that he feared God and no one else.
Starting December 1915 he gave a series of addresses to the Second Presbyterian Church, in North Topeka, starting with "Am I a Jonah?"

Career 
In 1882 he was admitted to the bar in Elk County, with his first official position as mayor of Howard the city where he lived.
He was then the Howard city attorney for several years, and then the Elk County Attorney from 1895 until 1899.
He later went on to become the Winfield city attorney and later an attorney for the Kansas State Temperance Union. 
He also worked as the state assistant attorney general under Fred S. Jackson, and as attorney for the railroad commission and public utilities commission from 1911 to 1913.
He was a Republican throughout his career.

He was known for being an outstanding figure in the enforcement of the Kansas prohibition laws.
Three decades before his death he had been a attorney for the Anti-Saloon League and the creator of the "padlock plan" for controlling blind pigs.
He also represented the Temperance Society of the Methodist Church in Colorado, and was part of the development of prohibition in Kansas.

In January 1914 he announced that he would run for the Kansas Supreme Court with a desire to move from being John Marshall of Elk county to John Marshall of Kansas, he was living in Topeka at the time.
Although popular with many in September 1914 Mrs Myra McHenry made it "Her Hobby Now" to go after Marshall's "political scalp" not believing he was fit for the position.
Mrs McHenry had known him for thirty years and circulated pamphlets criticizing him.
She claimed that while he was the prosecuting attorney for Cowley County, Kansas prisoners lounged in a carpeted lobby in the jail. 
She also claimed she was held under guard at her home charged with insanity, then escaped and on securing legal help the charges were dropped.

He was elected to the court along with John Shaw Dawson to replace Alfred Washburn Benson and Clark Allen Smith, with Henry Freeman Mason retaining his seat.

He also lectured at the Washburn Law School from around 1915 teaching Real Property.

Marshall died while serving his 17th year on the supreme court and Edward Ray Sloan was appointed to complete his unexpired term by Governor Harry Hines Woodring.

Death 
He died March 25, 1931 at his home in Topeka, Kansas aged 72, he had been suffering a prolonged illness.
He had had a severe cold that has prevented him from his service to the court for several weeks, returning for the January inaugural ceremonies.
Later that month he was again confined to his home with heart issues.
On the night of his death after sitting in a chair for an hour he complained of feeling tired and returned to bed, dying not long after. He was survived by his wife, two sons and a daughter.

References

External links 
 
 

1858 births
1931 deaths
Justices of the Kansas Supreme Court
People from Logansport, Indiana
Kansas State University alumni
Washburn University faculty
Kansas Republicans
American temperance activists
People from Topeka, Kansas